Upper Natone is a locality and small rural community in the local government area of Burnie in the North West region of Tasmania.
The 2016 census determined a population of 112 for the state suburb of Upper Natone.

History
The locality was gazetted in 1966.

Geography
The Blythe River forms the eastern boundary, and the Emu River forms much of the western boundary.

Road infrastructure
The C102 route (Upper Natone Road) passes through from north to south-west. Route C115 (South Riana Road) starts at an intersection with C102 and runs south-east before exiting.

References

Burnie, Tasmania
Towns in Tasmania